Fabio Fognini was the defender of title; however, he chose to not participate this year.
Potito Starace defeated Máximo González 7–6(4), 6–3 in the final.

Seeds

Draw

Final four

Top half

Bottom half

References
 Main Draw
 Qualifying Draw

Sporting Challenger - Singles
Sporting Challenger